Seyyedan is a city in Fars Province, Iran.

Seyyedan or Sayyedan or Saidan or Sidan or Saydan, some times rendered as Saiyideh, may also refer to:
 Seyyedan, East Azerbaijan
 Seyyedan, Gilan
 Seyyedan, Isfahan
 Sidan, alternate name of Sereyan, Isfahan Province
 Seyyedan, Khuzestan
 Seyyedan, alternate name of Istadegi, Khuzestan Province
 Seyyedan, Kurdistan
 Seyyedan, Darmian, South Khorasan Province
 Seyyedan, Khusf, South Khorasan Province

 Seyyedan District, in Fars Province
 Seyyedan Rural District, in East Azerbaijan Province

See also
 Baveleh-ye Seyyedan, West Azerbaijan Province, Iran
 Seydan (disambiguation)